Vitaz may refer to:

Víťaz - village in eastern Slovakia
Vityaz Ice Palace Ice rink